The Platform may refer to:

The Platform (film), a Spanish horror film
The Platform (TV series), an Emirati TV series
The Platform (album), a hip-hop album by the group Dilated Peoples
thePlatform, an online video publishing company
The Platform (Finland), a Finnish anarchist group
The Platform (Germany), a German anarcho-communist group
The Platform, a venue in Morecambe, England, in the former Morecambe Promenade railway station building
The Platform (radio station), a New Zealand online radio station

See also
Platform (disambiguation)